The 1965 Arizona State–Flagstaff Lumberjacks football team was an American football team that represented Arizona State College at Flagstaff (now known as Northern Arizona University) as an independent during the 1965 NCAA College Division football season. In their first year under head coach Andy MacDonald, the Lumberjacks compiled a 5–4–1 record and outscored opponents by a total of 196 to 106.

The team played its home games at Lumberjack Stadium in Flagstaff, Arizona.

Schedule

References

Arizona State-Flagstaff
Northern Arizona Lumberjacks football seasons
Arizona State-Flagstaff Lumberjacks football